Bachelor in Paradise is an American reality dating competition television series created for ABC. It is hosted by Chris Harrison, and is a spin-off of The Bachelor and The Bachelorette. The series is produced by Next Entertainment in association with Warner Horizon Television, and features previous contestants from The Bachelor and The Bachelorette isolated in a romantic paradise in an exotic tropical destination competing to find their true loves.

 On April 7, 2022, ABC renewed the series for a eighth season, which premiered on September 27, 2022.

Series overview

Episodes

Season 1 (2014)

Season 2 (2015)

Season 3 (2016)

Season 4 (2017)

Season 5 (2018)

Season 6 (2019)

Season 7 (2021)

Season 8 (2022)

References

External links
 
 

The Bachelor (franchise)
Lists of American reality television series episodes